Two Flags West is a 1950 Western drama set during the American Civil War, directed by Robert Wise and starring Joseph Cotten, Jeff Chandler, Linda Darnell, and Cornel Wilde. The opening credits contain the following statement:

On December 8th, 1863, President Abraham Lincoln issued a Special Proclamation, whereby Confederate Prisoners of War might gain their freedom, provided they would join the Union Army to defend the frontier West against the Indians.

Based on the historical service of "Galvanized Yankees", the film tells the story of a company of imprisoned Confederate Army cavalry troopers given such amnesty. The company of Georgia veterans journeys to a remote New Mexico post commanded by an embittered, Southerner-hating major who expects them to desert at the first opportunity. The fulfilment of that expectation is challenged by an attack on the fort itself by Kiowa.

Two Flags West was one of a wave of Civil War reconciliation-themed Westerns in the 1950s, in which soldiers from North and South combine against a common foe: it included Rocky Mountain (1950), The Last Outpost (1951), Escape from Fort Bravo (1953), and Revolt at Fort Laramie 
(1957).

Plot
In the autumn of 1864 remnants of the Confederate 5th Georgia Cavalry are prisoners of war in the Union prison camp at Rock Island, Illinois. Sick and dying in deplorable conditions, they find a chance for survival when Union Captain Mark Bradford (Cornel Wilde) offers them release from "this stinking pesthole" if they will join the Union Army to garrison a fort on the Western frontier, undermanned because its able-bodied regulars have been sent east, leaving only "greenhorns or casualties" like Bradford to fight Indians. Although promised that they will not be compelled to fight against their own, many of the Georgians resist the offer. The decision is put to a vote, but there is deadlock when the last soldier dies before he can choose. Compassion for his men, and Bradford's sincerity, compel their reluctant commander, Col. Clay Tucker (Joseph Cotten), to break the tie by agreeing to the conditions offered.

The troop arrives at Fort Thorn, New Mexico, a small outpost of the 3rd Cavalry. Their welcome from the commander, Major Henry Kenniston (Jeff Chandler), is stern and provocative. The bitter Kenniston has a limp from a wound that relegated him to Fort Thorn early in the war. Tucker, now a lieutenant in the Union Army, dines with Kenniston, his widowed sister-in-law Elena (Linda Darnell) and civilian guests, and is irritated by their patronising comments. The tension increases when Tucker reveals that he led the cavalry charge that killed Elena's husband. She has been stranded for months at the fort on her way home, and is uneasy about her brother-in-law's protectiveness, suspecting that he believes himself to be his late brother's surrogate.

Friction quickly develops between the Northern and Southern soldiers. When Tucker's men try to pursue a band of Indians but are ordered to stop, they mock the order as Yankee irresoluteness. Kenniston rebukes them, warning them they had been riding into an ambush. He assigns the Georgians to execute two civilians convicted of gunrunning.  When informed that they were actually Confederate agents Tucker objects as a violation of their enlistment agreement, but to no avail. He begins plotting to desert the command, which Kenniston shrewdly deduces. Rationalising that he does not want "enemies" in his ranks, he assigns Tucker's troop to escort a wagon train across hostile territory, knowing Tucker will deliver it safely before deserting. Elena escapes by concealing herself in a wagon, which Tucker discovers but allows to continue. Ephraim Strong (Harry von Zell), a civilian in the train, reveals himself as a Confederate agent and enlists Tucker in a plan to link California with the South. He persuades Tucker to return to Fort Thorn and to take back Elena to gain Kenniston's confidence. While surprised by Tucker's actions, Kenniston continues to be wary of him.

The troop is away from the fort when Kenniston executes a Kiowa warrior, son of the chief Satank, as a "rebel and traitor". Tucker receives his orders to join the Confederates and makes Bradford a prisoner. He has him escorted back to the fort but Bradford's escort returns to report that the fort is under siege by hundreds of Kiowa warriors. Despite strong misgivings, Tucker decides to return. The troop fights its way into the fort, but can only delay the inevitable, being saved from annihilation only by the setting of the sun. Bradford is killed. Kenniston decides to offer himself as a sacrifice and turns over command to Tucker. A few days later a dispatch rider arrives with news that Gen. Sherman has completed his march to the sea, spelling doom for the Confederacy. Elena tries to comfort a despairing Tucker with the hope that things will seem better tomorrow.

Cast
 Joseph Cotten as Lt. Clay Tucker
 Linda Darnell as Elena Kenniston
 Jeff Chandler as Maj. Henry Kenniston
 Cornel Wilde as Capt. Mark Bradford
 Dale Robertson as Lem
 Jay C. Flippen as Sgt. Duffy
 Noah Beery Jr. as Corp. Cy Davis (as Noah Beery)
 Harry von Zell as Ephraim Strong
 Johnny Sands as Lt. Adams (as John Sands)
 Arthur Hunnicutt as Sgt. Pickens

Casting notes
Fox had originally intended the role of "Col. Clay Tucker" to be played by either Victor Mature or Richard Basehart, but Joseph Cotten was cast at the last minute, loaned to Fox by Selznick International Pictures.

Production
The film was originally known as Trumpet to the Morn.

The role of the major was meant to be played by Lee J. Cobb who owed 20th Century Fox a film. (He had recently ended a long-term contract with the studio after refusing to make Where the Sidewalk Ends.) However, Cobb was replaced by Jeff Chandler, who had a six-film contract with Fox after making Broken Arrow of which this was the second movie. He had to commute from Hollywood to the location because of his radio commitments.

Locations
The movie was filmed on location at San Ildefonso Pueblo, New Mexico, using buildings of the Pueblo for those of the Fort Thorn, and on the nearby Shipman Ranch near Black Mesa, which is seen prominently in the film. The local Tewa inhabitants agreed to use of their community, some of whose buildings dated back 400 years, when director Robert Wise promised that filming would remain clear of the tribal kiva (underground council room), cemetery, and sacred shrines.

Historical basis
Screenwriter Frank S. Nugent developed the concept for the film while writing the screenplay for She Wore a Yellow Ribbon in 1948. During research Nugent consulted historians Dee Brown and Martin F. Schmitt, authors of Fighting Indians of the West, for sources of information about the use of "Galvanized Yankees", and learned that  Confederate plans to connect El Paso, Texas with California were formulated in late 1864. He submitted his story, The Yankee From Georgia, to Metro-Goldwyn-Mayer but did not receive an offer. The project for Fox began with the working title, Trumpet to the Morn. The circumstances of the recruiting and delivery of Tucker's men are similar to those experienced by Union Capt. Henry Palmer and Company K of the 11th Ohio Cavalry from Camp Chase, Ohio, to Fort Kearney, Nebraska, and thence on to Fort Laramie, Wyoming in 1864. They were also the only former Confederate cavalrymen (originally part of Morgan's Raiders) to see service as "Galvanized Yankees" on the Western frontier.

Fort Thorn became the eastern terminus of a road built in 1856 across Arizona from Fort Yuma until 1860, when the post closed as a permanent garrison.

In 1861 it was reoccupied as a forward outpost when the Civil War began and Texas organised an expeditionary force to seize New Mexico as part of its Arizona Territory. Union troops withdrew from Fort Thorn in August after a defeat at Mesilla at the Texas end of the valley. Confederate forces occupied the site in January 1862 to stage an advance north, but in April were forced to withdraw from New Mexico. Fort Thorn again became a Union post on July 4, 1862.

Union forces stationed at Fort Thorn were companies of the 3rd Infantry and Regiment of Mounted Riflemen (which became the 3rd Cavalry in 1861) between 1855 and 1860, and the 5th Infantry. In September 1861, Captain Robert M. Morris defeated a force of Texans near Fort Thorn with Companies C, G and K of the 3rd Cavalry. Detachments of the 3rd Cavalry continued to operate from Fort Thorn, as depicted, until September 1862, when that regiment was sent east to fight against the Confederacy. Although Fort Thorn was probably not occupied after that time, the 5th Infantry remained in New Mexico throughout the Civil War, and in theory its forces could have been augmented by "Galvanized Yankees".

The 5th Georgia Cavalry was an actual unit of the Confederate Army of the Tennessee but saw service exclusively in the war's Western Theater, not with Jeb Stuart as depicted. Satank was an actual person but his notoriety was primarily post-bellum of the Civil War, and in Texas. The only officer commissioned from the ranks of the "Galvanized Yankees" was John T. Shanks, born in Texas, who had been a supply captain of the Tennessee Volunteers captured with Morgan's Raiders. Characterised as an adventurer, con man, and criminal, he was awarded command of a company of the 6th U.S.V.I. for his assistance in thwarting a breakout at the Camp Douglas prison camp. A detachment of Company H of the 5th U.S.V.I. escorting a wagon train in June 1865 is the only known unit of Galvanized Yankees to venture into New Mexico.

The plot scenario of the Confederacy attempting to militarily link Texas to California was attempted in 1862. In the film, when Confederate agent Ephraim Strong enlists Tucker into participating in the scheme, Tucker alludes to the unsuccessful New Mexico Campaign by saying, "You mean what General Sibley had in mind three years ago?"  Historically the strategy remained a proposed contingency until late in the war, although it was never again attempted.

Reception
Two Flags West opened October 14, 1950, at the Rivoli Theater in New York City, to a favorable review from New York Times critic Bosley Crowther.

References

External links 
 
 
 
Review of film at Variety

1950 Western (genre) films
1950 films
American black-and-white films
Western (genre) cavalry films
American Civil War films
Films directed by Robert Wise
American Western (genre) films
20th Century Fox films
Films scored by Hugo Friedhofer
1950 drama films
1950s English-language films
1950s American films